Voisey may refer to:

 Robert Voisey (born 1969), composer and impresario
 William Voisey (1891–1964), football player and manager
 Neuvelle-lès-Voisey, commune in France
 Voisey, Haute-Marne, a commune in the Haute-Marne department, France 
 Voisey's Bay, a bay in eastern Canada